Sir Thomas Henry Grattan Esmonde, 11th Baronet,  (21 September 1862 – 15 September 1935) was an Irish Home Rule nationalist politician and author.

Politics
Esmonde was elected Irish Parliamentary Party MP for the constituencies South Dublin 1885–1892, West Kerry 1892–1900 and North Wexford 1900–1918 in the House of Commons of the United Kingdom of Great Britain and Ireland. He also sat as an independent Senator in the Oireachtas from 1922 to 1934. He was High Sheriff of County Waterford in 1887.

Personal life
He was the son of Sir John Esmonde, 10th Baronet and his wife Louisa, daughter of Henry Grattan.

In July 1891, he married Alice Donovan of Tralee.
Alice and Esmonde had five children:
Alngelda Barbara Mary Grattan Esmonde
Eithne Moira Grattan Esmonde; married her second cousin Sir Anthony Esmonde, 15th Baronet
Patricia Alison Louisa Grattan Esmonde
Sir Osmond Esmonde, 12th Baronet (1896–1936)
John Henry Grattan Esmonde (1899–1916); killed in the Battle of Jutland

Alice died in December 1922, and in September 1924 Esmonde married Anna Frances Levins.

Esmonde's home, Ballynastragh House, located near Gorey, County Wexford, and dating from the 17th century, was burned down on 9 March 1923 by members of the anti-Treaty Irish Republican Army. The house was rebuilt on a much smaller scale in 1937.

Esmonde was a frequent traveller and author of articles on Irish folklore and antiquities, as well as a memoir, Hunting Memories of Many Lands (1920). He died in Dublin, six days before his 73rd birthday.

In 1902 he founded the Enniscorthy Echo in co-operation with William Sears.

Honours
Knight of the Order of the Holy Sepulchre

See also
Families in the Oireachtas

References

External links
Esmonde Family Tree

 

1862 births
1935 deaths
Baronets in the Baronetage of Ireland
Irish Parliamentary Party MPs
Members of the Parliament of the United Kingdom for County Dublin constituencies (1801–1922)
Members of the Parliament of the United Kingdom for County Kerry constituencies (1801–1922)
Members of the Parliament of the United Kingdom for County Wexford constituencies (1801–1922)
UK MPs 1885–1886
UK MPs 1886–1892
UK MPs 1892–1895
UK MPs 1895–1900
UK MPs 1900–1906
UK MPs 1906–1910
UK MPs 1910
UK MPs 1910–1918
Members of the 1922 Seanad
Members of the 1925 Seanad
Members of the 1928 Seanad
Members of the 1931 Seanad
Politicians from County Wexford
Thomas
High Sheriffs of County Waterford
Knights of the Holy Sepulchre
Independent members of Seanad Éireann
People from Gorey
Anti-Parnellite MPs